The 30th Waffen Grenadier Division of the SS (1st Belarusian) was a short-lived German Waffen SS infantry division formed largely from Belarusian, Russian and Ukrainian personnel of the Schutzmannschaft-Brigade Siegling in August 1944 at Warsaw in the General Government. The division was transferred to southeastern France by mid-August 1944 to combat the French Forces of the Interior (FFI). The division's performance in combat was poor, and two battalions mutinied, murdered their German leaders, and defected to the FFI. Other troops of the division crossed the Swiss border and were interned. Afterwards, some of the division's personnel were transferred to the Russian Liberation Army while others were retained to form the SS "White Ruthenian" infantry brigade from January 1945.

Formation and initial organization
On 31 July 1944 orders were issued to form a division from the personnel of the Schutzmannschaft-Brigade Siegling, who were subsequently organized into four infantry regiments (numbered 1 through 4). The initial organization of the division also included an artillery battalion, a cavalry battalion, and a training battalion. At this time, the division's full name was 30. Waffen-Grenadier-Division der SS (russische Nr. 2). The term "Waffen-Grenadier" was used to denote SS infantry divisions manned by personnel of other-than-German ethnicity.

At the end of August 1944, division strength was estimated as 11,600 with the bulk originating from Belarus. The leadership cadre of the division was primarily German.

In mid-August 1944, the division was moved by rail to northeastern France in the region of Belfort and Mulhouse. By October, the organization of the division had been altered to three infantry regiments of three battalions each, a motorcycle (reconnaissance) battalion, an artillery battalion, and a field replacement battalion. The artillery battalion consisted of two batteries of captured 122-mm Soviet artillery pieces.

Mutiny and desertion
Elements of the division arrived in Vesoul on 20 August 1944 and were charged with the security of the Belfort Gap, particularly against operations conducted by the French Forces of the Interior (FFI). The same day, other elements of the division occupied the area around Camp Valdahon, about thirty kilometers southeast of Besançon.

Subsequent events demonstrated the division's lack of loyalty to the Nazi cause. On 27 August 1944, under the direction of Major Lev (Leon) Hloba, a Ukrainian battalion of the division at Vesoul shot their German leadership cadre and defected to an FFI unit in the Confracourt Woods, bringing 818 men, 45-mm antitank guns, 82-mm and 50-mm mortars, 21 heavy machine guns, as well as large amounts of small arms and small-calibre ammunition. A similar defection occurred the same day near Camp Valdahon and brought over hundreds of men, one antitank gun, eight heavy machine guns, four mortars, and small arms and ammunition.  The defectors were subsequently inducted into the FFI as the 1st and 2nd Ukrainian Battalions and many were later amalgamated into the 13th Demi-Brigade of Foreign Legion, itself subordinated to the 1st Free French Division.

On 29 August 1944, the first and third battalions of the division's 4th Regiment deserted and crossed the border into Switzerland.

On 2 September, two squadrons (companies) of the division's cavalry battalion (formerly Kosaken-Schuma-Abteilung 68 and redesignated the Waffen-Reiter-Abteilung der SS 30) were surrounded and destroyed in a surprise attack at Melin by the Ukrainians who had defected in the Confracourt woods.

The subsequent investigation of these events by German authorities resulted in some 2,300 men in the division being deemed "unreliable".  As punishment, this personnel were transferred to two field entrenchment construction regiments subordinated to the Karlsruhe Transport Commandant, leaving some 5,500 men still in the division. The extraordinary events in the division also led to it being placed in Army Group G reserve and being viewed by senior German leadership in Alsace as an unreliable unit.

On 24 October 1944, the division had reorganized into three regiments, numbered 75 to 77, each of two infantry battalions. This organization accorded with the orders for the formation of the division that had been issued in August 1944 by the SS Führungshauptamt.  Because of losses, however, the 77th Regiment was disbanded on 2 November.

Combat
The success of the French breakthrough in the Belfort Gap starting on 13 November 1944 created a crisis in the German defences from Belfort to Mulhouse. With defending units under severe pressure by the French advance, the Germans committed the 30th SS Division to counterattack the French attack at Seppois.  The advance of the SS division on 19 November reached a point roughly a mile north of Seppois, but was held there and pushed back by French counterattacks. The division then went on the defensive in the area around Altkirch.

As the German situation in lower Alsace solidified into what would become known as the Colmar Pocket, the 30th SS Division remained in the German front line north of Huningue and west of the Rhine River. In late December 1944, with its manpower down to 4,400 men, the division was withdrawn from the front and ordered to the Grafenwöhr training area deep inside of Germany.

Disbandment and second formation
Orders to disband the division were issued on 1 January 1945, and the division arrived at Grafenwöhr on 11 January. Russian personnel in the division were transferred to the 600th Infantry Division, a unit of Russians organized by Nazi Germany and belonging to the Russian Liberation Army.

On 15 January 1945, the non-Russian personnel of the division were organized into the 1st White Ruthenian SS Grenadier Brigade, a unit that had only a single regiment of infantry (the 75th) with three battalions as well as some other units such as an artillery battalion and a cavalry battalion. While still organizing, the brigade was retitled the 30th SS Grenadier Division (1st White Ruthenian) on 9 March 1945, but it still had only a single regiment of infantry. Finally, in April 1945, this iteration of the division was also disbanded, with the German cadre being sent to the 25th and 38th SS Grenadier Divisions.

Known war crimes
Soldiers of the division together with an unspecified Italian unit killed 40 civilians in Étobon, France on 27 September 1944, in retaliation for the support given by villagers to the French partisans. An additional 27 were taken from the village to Germany; of whom seven were shot ten days later.

Commanders

See also
Schutzmannschaft-Brigade Siegling
29th Waffen Grenadier Division of the SS RONA (1st Russian)
List of German divisions in World War II
List of Waffen-SS divisions
List of SS personnel

References

Footnotes

Bibliography

External links
 
 

Foreign volunteer units of the Waffen-SS
Infantry divisions of the Waffen-SS
Military units and formations established in 1944
Military units and formations disestablished in 1945
Mutinies in World War II